Hypolamprus bastialis is a moth of the family Thyrididae first described by Francis Walker in 1859. It is found in India, Sri Lanka, Indonesia, New Guinea and Australia.

Its wings are pale brown with a network of brown lines.

References

Moths of Asia
Moths described in 1859
Thyrididae